Goldin is a surname that can independently be of English, German or Jewish origin. Notable people with the surname include:

Alexander Goldin (born 1964), Russian chess player
Amy Goldin (1926–1978), American art critic
Barry Goldin (born 1978), British racing driver
Brett Goldin (1977–2006), South African actor
Claudia Goldin (born 1946), American economist
Daniel Goldin (born 1940), American administrator
Gayle Goldin (born 1971), American politician
Godfrey Goldin (1919–1943), Australian rules footballer 
Harrison J. Goldin (born 1936), American politician
Horace Goldin (1873–1939), British magician
Hyman Goldin (1881–1972), American writer
Ian Goldin (born 1955), South African economist
Nan Goldin (born 1953), American photographer
Rebecca Goldin, American mathematician
Ricky Paull Goldin (born 1965), American actor
Sergey Goldin (1936–2007), Russian scientist
Sidney M. Goldin (1880–1937), American filmmaker
Stephen Goldin (born 1947), American writer
Theodore W. Goldin (1858–1935), American soldier

See also
Goldin Finance 117, a building in Tianjin, China
The Goldin Institute, a nonprofit in Chicago, Illinois
Golden (name)
Golding (surname)

References

English-language surnames
Jewish surnames
Yiddish-language surnames
Surnames of English origin
Surnames of German origin